The CBS Studio Building is a seven-story office building at 49 East 52nd Street in Midtown Manhattan, New York City. It has had various uses at different times, including serving as a Vanderbilt family guest house, the first graduate school of the Juilliard School, CBS Radio studios, and Columbia Records studio.

It is currently owned by the Fisher Brothers, who converted it to an office building in conjunction with construction of the 45-story Park Avenue Plaza to its east.

Vanderbilts
It was built in 1908 as a guest house for the Vanderbilts who had a home a block away at Fifth Avenue and 52nd. It was designed by Warren and Wetmore.

Juilliard
In 1924 the Vanderbilts sold it to the Juilliard Musical Foundation where it became Juilliard's first graduate school.

CBS Radio
In 1939, CBS, which had its corporate headquarters around the corner at 485 Madison Avenue, bought the building at 49 East 52nd Street, to move its radio operations, except for the main network newsroom.

Architects Fellheimer & Wagner extensively renovated the building—including eliminating the earlier Vanderbilt ornate external features and eliminating windows for soundproofing—and carved up the building into seven studios, including one which could accommodate audiences of 300 as well as symphony orchestras that could broadcast. Arthur Godfrey broadcast from Studio 21 in the building and had his main office there.

Columbia Records
With the advent of television, large radio studios that could accommodate audiences were no longer needed. Radio operations moved to the CBS Broadcast Center at 524 West 57th Street. By 1966 the facility had become recording studios for Columbia Records. Frank Sinatra, Barbra Streisand, Leonard Cohen, Laura Nyro, Bob Dylan (in spring 1970 for part of his New Morning album), Paul Simon, Paul McCartney and Mahavishnu Orchestra (Birds Of Fire) recorded music there.

The facility contained Columbia's "Studio B" on the second floor and "Studio E" on the sixth floor. From 1974 until 1982, CBS Radio Mystery Theatre was recorded in Studio 27, renamed Studio G in honor of Arthur Godfrey.

Fisher Brothers
In 1979 the Fisher Brothers acquired the land under the building in conjunction with construction of the Park Avenue Plaza building to its east. However, CBS retained ownership of the building itself. In 1988 the building was leased to Sony, which had purchased CBS Records, and a Duane Reade store opened on the ground level and second floor. For several years CBS used studio space as offices. CBS eventually sold the building to Fisher Brothers in 1993, and in 1996 Fisher Brothers undid the 1930s Art Moderne style, replacing the windows and replicating the original Vanderbilt appearance.

See also 
 CBS 30th Street Studio

References

Further reading 
 Cogan, Jim; Clark, William, Temples of sound : inside the great recording studios, San Francisco : Chronicle Books, 2003. . Cf. chapter on Columbia Studios, pp. 181–192.

Houses completed in 1908
Office buildings in Manhattan
Juilliard School
CBS Radio
Recording studios in Manhattan
Vanderbilt family
Paramount Global
Warren and Wetmore buildings
1908 establishments in New York City
Midtown Manhattan
Arthur Godfrey